The Battle of Stalling Down, also known as the Battle of Bryn Owain, is a battle reputed to have taken place between late autumn or early winter of 1403 or 1405 between a Welsh army under Owain Glyndŵr and an English army under King Henry IV of England. It was part of the Welsh Revolt of 1400–1415.

Location 
Stalling Down is a rolling area of open land  a few miles east of the town of Cowbridge, now the village common of St Hilary in the Vale of Glamorgan. The exact site of the battle and the precise details of the action are not known. The general site is known locally as Bryn Owain, meaning Owain's Hill.

The site was known as Stallington, evolving to Stalling Down. A Roman road runs over the hill as it traverses the area and would have been a convenient route for moving a very large army along for the English.

The Opposing Forces 
The Welsh army included a small French contingent assimilated into forces from Morgannwg led by Rhys Gethin ('swarthy Rhys') and Cadwgan, Lord of Glyn Rhondda commanded another contingent from the Rhondda Valleys region. Cadwgan had a home at Aberochwy, near what is today Treorchy. He fought using a battleaxe as his weapon of choice and was later known as Cadwgan of the Bloody Axe. Owain Glyndŵr is also reported to have been present in the battle in person.

Outcome 
The battle is said to have lasted 18 hours and resulted in an appalling defeat for the King's army. The blood was fetlock deep on the horses that survived the battle.

The English army retreated through Cardiff pursued by the Welsh in terrible conditions, which included a thunderstorm and flooding.

Examination of Evidence 
In nearby Llanblethian church in 1896 explorations prior to Victorian church improvements revealed an oak plank in the floor, which when prised up, revealed a stone stairway descending to a crypt. Inside the crypt were piled three hundred male skeletons, without coffins, and the only known battle to have taken place in this area is Stalling Down. The crypt measured some seventeen feet by fifteen and stood seven feet high at its highest point, the apex of the arched and vaulted roof. Small wall openings to the exterior had been covered up on the outside by earth, effectively sealing the crypt to the outside world. The bones were immediately buried in the churchyard. The clerk's pew contains an inscription that this church was the burial place of the Sweeting family 'before the war with Owen Glyndŵr'. The church is some three miles from the battle ground.

More recently, historians have begun to question the veracity of the report of a battle at Stalling Down; for example, a modern authority on Glyndŵr, the late R. R. Davies, made no mention of it in his account of the revolt, published in 1995. The problem lies in the fact that the earliest recorded reference to the battle is late, and is found in the works of the 18th-century historian Iolo Morganwg, although Morganwg's account held considerable sway, and was repeated by several later writers, including the Edwardian historian Arthur Bradley in his 1901 biography of Owain Glyndŵr. In it, he places the battle in 1405, calling it the 'battle of Bryn Owen'. 

Nevertheless, in spite of this uncertainty it is not safe to conclude that the Battle of Stalling Down never occurred. The discovery of a crypt in the area containing three hundred male skeletons without coffins, combined with the fact there is much local tradition to be found in connection with it, and the context of a battle in either the summer of 1403 or 1405 accords well with our understanding of the progress of Glyndŵr's revolt, as Glyndŵr's presence at nearby Carmarthen in the summer of 1403 is well attested, and it may be that an English incursion along the roman road into nearby Glamorgan produced a confrontation of which the battle of Stalling Down, as remembered today, is a manifestation.

References

Bibliography

Stalling Down
Stalling Down
1403 in England
15th century in Wales
Conflicts in 1403
Cowbridge
1403 in Wales
Glyndŵr Rising